The Charlotte Hornets are a National Basketball Association (NBA) team.

Charlotte Hornets may also refer to:
 Charlotte Hornets (baseball), a minor league baseball team from 1901 to 1973
 Charlotte Hornets (WFL), a defunct World Football League team (1974–1975)